Provincial Route 11 is a  Argentine road in the East of Buenos Aires Province. The road extends from Punta Lara (starting in the junction with PR 19) to the town of Mar del Sur.

Route 11 runs along the coasts of the Río de la Plata and the Atlantic Ocean, with a high number of car passing the road during summertime. The path between Magdalena and the intersection with Provincial Route 36 is still a graved road so the route has not been paved to date. On the other hand, from the crossing with Provincial Route 63 (popularly known as Esquina de Crotto) to the town of General Conesa, the route becomes a dual carriageway, totalizing 30 km with two carriages per way. The stretch between Pinamar and Villa Gesell the route becomes a dual carriageway again.

This road contributed to development of the cities situated on the Buenos Aires Province coast at the Nort of Mar del Plata, due to the only town of the region reached by railway was Pinamar. The train that departed from General Guido until its terminus in Divisadero de Pinamar (a branch-line of General Roca Railway from Buenos Aires to Mar del Plata) operated from 1949 to 1968, being reestablished in December, 1996  although in April 2015 was closed again, remaining inactive to date.

History

The beginning

The first works on the road were made in the zone of Mar del Plata. The path between the downtown and Camet Park was paved in 1928, then followed by the pavement of the stretch to the Punta Mogotes lighthouse, finished in 1933.
 
In 1932 the Camino de la Costa a provincial road that extended from Avellaneda to Mar del Plata along with the coasts of the Río de la Plata and the Atlantic Ocean was opened. Four years later the coast road in Punta Lara was built. Nevertheless, the Sudestada (Southeast blow) caused a flooding that destroyed most of the road. For that reason, a wall was raised to avoid floodings; nevertheless, the water was eroding the wall until in July 1958, a new swell of the river brought down the wall, destroying the "Camino Costanero" (as Route 11 was also called). The flooding not only damaged the road but about 100,000 houses were devastated by the unstoppable course of the water 

The paved road from Mar del Plata and Miramar was built between 1937 and 1938, while the stretch between La Plata and Magdalena was finished in 1961.

Whten the pavement of Route 11 was definitely finished at the end of the 1970s, some parts of the original road were changed. The old path was farther from the coast. The old path is still a graved road.

In 1986 the Government of Buenos Aires Province transferred the stretch of the road crossing the urban area of Mar del Plata, to General Pueyrredón Partido On December 5, 1987, the paved path from Miramar to Mar del Sur was opened to traffic

Concession
On September 19, 1990, the contract of concession was signed. The management of the road was subsequently given to "Camino del Atlántico" ("Road of the Atlantic" in Spanish), which would take over the maintenance of the Route from the intersection with Provincial Route 36 to the traffic circle access to Santa Clara del Mar. The contract was for a term of 15 years, with the option to be extended to 20 years through a special clause. The toll booths were placed in "Paraje La Huella", near General Conesa, and Mar Chiquita.

During 1996 the concessionary built a dual carriageway between the cities of Pinamar and Villa Gesell, financed by an increase of the toll rates which was made effective once the works finished.

In December 2010 a 10 km path between Santa Clara del Mar and Parque Camet was opened. The works had a cost of $43 million.

In July 2011 the Government of Buenos Aires trespassed the management of the Route 11 to "Autovía del Mar" for a term of 30 years. The company also manages Provincial routes Autovía 2, 63, 56, 74 and 36. In 2016, Gobernor of Buenos Aires, María Eugenia Vidal revoked concessions so route 11 become state-owned again.

Major intersections 

Notes

References

External links

 AUBASA, concessionary 
 Dirección de Vialidad de Buenos Aires

Provincial roads in Buenos Aires Province